Bogdan Bojić (born 3 March 1999) is a Montenegrin professional basketball player for Sutjeska of the Montenegrin Basketball League.

Playing career 
In July 2020, Bojić signed for a Bosnian team Sloboda Tuzla.

References

External links
 Bogdan Bojić at aba-liga.com
 Bogdan Bojić at euroleague.net

1999 births
Living people
ABA League players
KK Budućnost players
KK Studentski centar players
OKK Sloboda Tuzla players
KK Sutjeska players
Montenegrin men's basketball players
Small forwards